Campo de Fútbol Municipal de Barreiro is an all-seater football stadium located in Lavadores, Vigo.

The stadium is owned and operated by Vigo city council. Municipal de Barreiro is used by Celta B. It hosts games in Segunda División B, where the club plays. The capacity is 4,500 seats.

References

External links
 Barreiro at Google Maps
 Estadios de España 

Football venues in Galicia (Spain)
RC Celta de Vigo